I Am a Promise: The Children of Stanton Elementary School is a 1993 American documentary film about the pupils at Stanton Elementary School, an inner city school in Philadelphia. It was aired on HBO as part of its America Undercover series.

Accolades
The film won the Academy Award for Best Documentary Feature for producers Alan and Susan Raymond. It also was the recipient of the Primetime Emmy Award for Best Informational Special and a 1995 Alfred I. duPont–Columbia University Award

Production
The husband and wife documentarians were also the cinematographer and editor (Alan) as well as director and narrator (Susan) for the film.

See also
The Police Tapes (1977)
The War Room - D.A. Pennebaker documentary nominated alongside I Am a Promise for same Oscar category

References

External links

 I Am a Promise: The Children of Stanton Elementary School at Video Verite Films
 Peabody Award acceptance speech

1993 films
American documentary films
Best Documentary Feature Academy Award winners
Documentary films about education in the United States
Education in Philadelphia
1993 documentary films
Documentary films about Philadelphia
Primetime Emmy Award-winning broadcasts
Peabody Award-winning broadcasts
1990s English-language films
1990s American films